The name Maysak has been used to name four tropical cyclones in the northwestern Pacific Ocean. The name was contributed by Cambodia and is a kind of tree.

Severe Tropical Storm Maysak (2002) (T0223, 29W)
Tropical Storm Maysak (2008) (T0819, 24W, Quinta-Siony)
Typhoon Maysak (2015) (T1504, 04W, Chedeng) – an unusually intense typhoon during the early part of 2015
Typhoon Maysak (2020) (T2009, 10W, Julian) - a powerful category 4 typhoon that passed through the Ryukyu Islands and caused heavy damage on the Korean Peninsula

Pacific typhoon set index articles